The BMW S1000XR is a sport touring motorcycle produced by BMW Motorrad since 2015. The all-rounder motorcycle was presented on 4 November 2014 at the EICMA, Milan, Italy.

The partially faired motorcycle is technically based on the S1000R naked bike and is marketed by the manufacturer as an "Adventure Sport Bike". After the fully enclosed sport bikes S1000RR and HP4 as well as the roadster S1000R, the XR is the fourth variant with the inline four-cylinder engine and assembled at the BMW plant in Berlin. The production started on 1 April 2015 and went on sale on 13 June.

References

External links 
 

S1000XR
Sport touring motorcycles
Motorcycles introduced in 2014